Matthew Jason Miller is an American physician and epidemiologist. He is an adjunct professor of epidemiology at the Harvard School of Public Health, where is also the co-director of the Harvard Injury Control Research Center. He is also a professor of health sciences and epidemiology at Northeastern University. He is board certified in internal medicine and medical oncology. He is known for his research into injury and violence prevention.

Education
Miller received his bachelors' and medical degrees from Yale University, after which he received his M.P.H. and Sc.D. from the Harvard School of Public Health.

Research
Miller is known for researching multiple topics pertaining to injury prevention, including homicide, suicide, and accidental injuries. For example, he has conducted studies on the relationship between firearm ownership, firearm laws, and suicide and homicide rates. He has also surveyed gun owners in order to estimate the number of privately owned guns in the United States, as well as how many recently acquired guns were purchased without a background check. These surveys have estimated that there are about 265 million privately owned guns in the United States, and that about one-fifth of guns purchased in the last two years were acquired without the purchaser undergoing a background check. He has also published studies on the association between high doses of antidepressants and self-harm among young people.

References

External links
Curriculum Vitae

Living people
Harvard School of Public Health faculty
Harvard School of Public Health alumni
American epidemiologists
Gun violence researchers
Yale School of Medicine alumni
Northeastern University faculty
Suicidologists
American oncologists
Year of birth missing (living people)